Ariclenes da Silva Ferreira (born 11 December 1985), commonly known as Ari, is a professional footballer who plays as a striker for Atletico Cearense. Born in Brazil, he represented the Russia national team after being naturalised.

He started his professional career in 2005 with his hometown club Fortaleza, and signed for Swedish club Kalmar one year later. After two and a half seasons in AZ Alkmaar, he played in the Russian Premier League for Spartak Moscow, Krasnodar, and Lokomotiv Moscow.

Club career

Having joined Allsvenskan team Kalmar FF in spring 2006, Ari was the top scorer in the Allsvenskan 2006 with 15 goals, amassing one goal more than compatriot Afonso Alves had the previous season.

On 28 May 2007, Ari signed a five-year contract with AZ for an undisclosed fee. At Alkmaar he struggled to force his way into the first team on a regular basis, but he did win the 2008–09 Eredivisie.

In January 2010 Ari was transferred to Spartak Moscow for €3 million. Despite a successful career at the club, he departed amidst a conflict with management.

On 19 August 2013, he signed a three-year contract with FC Krasnodar. He left Krasnodar on 17 May 2021, after being a key player for eight seasons

International career
In 2016, after Kosovo's membership in UEFA and FIFA, Ari was offered a chance to play for the Kosovo national team by their coach, Albert Bunjaki. Coincidentally, he was also an assistant coach at Kalmar, Ari's former club. The offer was rejected by the Football Federation of Kosovo's president, Fadil Vokrri.

In July 2017, Ari confirmed his desire to obtain Russian citizenship and represent the Russia national team at the 2018 World Cup. However, the citizenship process was delayed and he received a Russian passport in July 2018. On 12 November 2018, Ari was called up to the Russian squad for the first time for the friendly matches against Germany and Sweden.

Personal life
As of now, Ari is one of three Brazilians who played for the Russian national team, the others being Guilherme Marinato and Mário Fernandes. He and Guilherme can speak Russian.

After Ari was called up to the Russian national team, Pavel Pogrebnyak said: "I don't see the point of this. I do not understand at all why Ari received a Russian passport. It is laughable when a black player represents the Russian national side". Accused of racism, an investigation was subsequently launched, after which Pogrebnyak was fined and put on probation.

Career statistics

Notes

Honours

Fortaleza
 Campeonato Cearense: 2005

Kalmar
 Svenska Cupen: 2007

AZ Alkmaar
 Eredivisie: 2008–09
 Johan Cruijff Shield: 2009

Krasnodar
 Russian Cup: runner-up 2013–14

Lokomotiv Moscow
 Russian Premier League: 2017–18
 Russian Cup: 2016–17

Individual
 Allsvenskan Top Scorer: 2006 (15 goals)

References

External links
Voetbal International 
Ari discussion 
Ari signs for AZ 
Ari signs for AZ 

1985 births
Living people
Sportspeople from Fortaleza
Russian footballers
Russia international footballers
Brazilian footballers
Brazilian emigrants to Russia
Naturalised citizens of Russia
Russian people of Brazilian descent
Association football forwards
Fortaleza Esporte Clube players
Kalmar FF players
AZ Alkmaar players
Allsvenskan players
Eredivisie players
Campeonato Brasileiro Série A players
Brazilian expatriate footballers
Russian expatriate footballers
Expatriate footballers in Sweden
Brazilian expatriate sportspeople in Sweden
Russian expatriate sportspeople in Sweden
Expatriate footballers in the Netherlands
Brazilian expatriate sportspeople in the Netherlands
Russian expatriate sportspeople in the Netherlands
Russian Premier League players
FC Spartak Moscow players
FC Krasnodar players
FC Lokomotiv Moscow players